Antonia de Bañuelos Thorndike (also called Marquesa de Alcedo; 1856–1926) was a Spanish painter, born in Rome, who spent most of her life in Paris.

She was the daughter of the Earl of Bañuelos, and a disciple of Charles Joshua Chaplin. At the Paris Exposition of 1878, several portraits by this artist attracted attention, one of them being a portrait of herself. 

At the Exposition of 1880, she exhibited "A Guitar Player". Her works The Little Fishers and Study of a laughing baby were included in the book Women Painters of the World.

References

1856 births
1926 deaths
20th-century Spanish painters
20th-century Spanish women artists
19th-century Spanish women artists
Spanish expatriates in Italy
Spanish expatriates in France
Artists from Rome
Spanish portrait painters
Genre painters